Chahar Cheshmeh or Chehar Chashmeh may refer to:
 Chahar Cheshmeh, Hamadan
 Chahar Cheshmeh-ye Nazem, Lorestan Province
 Chahar Cheshmeh, Markazi
 Chahar Cheshmeh, alternate name of Qaleh-ye Hajji Shafi, Markazi Province
 Chahar Cheshmeh-ye Olya, Razavi Khorasan Province
 Chahar Cheshmeh Rural District, in Markazi Province